T. darwini may refer to:
 Tanaoneura darwini, a species of parasitic wasp
 Tarentola darwini, the Darwin's wall gecko, a lizard species in the genus Tarentola
 Thecacera darwini, a sea slug species in the genus Thecacera
 Toxodon darwini, an extinct mammal species of the late Pliocene and Pleistocene epochs
 Trichoniscus darwini, Vandel, 1938, a woodlouse species in the genus Trichoniscus

See also
 T. darwinii (disambiguation)
 Darwini (disambiguation)